Malda district, also spelt Maldah or Maldaha (often ), is a district in West Bengal, India. It lies 347 km (215 miles) north of Kolkata, the capital of West Bengal. Mango, jute and silk are the most notable products of this district. The special variety of mango, Fazli, produced in this region is popularly known by the name of the district and is exported across the world and is internationally acclaimed. The folk culture of gombhira is a feature of the district, being a unique way of representation of joy and sorrow in daily life of the common people, as well as the unique medium of presentation on national and international matters.  According to the National Investigation Agency Malda is believed to be a hub of a fake currency racket. It is reported that 90 percent of the fake currency that enters India originates in Malda.

The headquarters of Malda district is in English Bazar, also known as Malda, which was once the capital of Bengal. The district maintains the traditions of the past in culture and education. Old Malda, the town which lies just east of the confluence of the Mahananda and Kalindi rivers, is part of the English Bazar metropolitan city. The town rose to prominence as the river port of the old capital of Pandua. During the 18th century, it was the seat of prosperous cotton and silk industries. It remains an important distribution centre for rice, jute, and wheat. The area between the historical monument of Jame Masjid (1566) and the landmark of Nimasarai Tower across the river Mahananda, constituted a municipality in 1867. Rice, jute, legumes, and oilseed are the chief crops in the surrounding area. Malda is the largest producer of excellent quality jute in India. Mulberry plantations and mango orchards also occupy large areas; mango trade and silk manufacture are the main economic activities.

History

Pre-Gour Era
Pāṇini mentioned a city named Gourpura, which by strong reason may be identified as the city of Gouda, ruins of which are situated in this district. Examples are legion of the relics of a predecessor kingdom being used in the monuments of the successor kingdoms.

It had been within the limits of ancient Gour and  Pandua (Pundrabardhana). These two cities had been the capital of Bengal in ancient and medieval ages and are equidistant, north and south, from English Bazar town (once known as Engelzavad established by the British rulers).

The boundary of Gour was changed in different ages since the fifth century BC, and its name can be found in Puranic texts. Pundranagara was the provincial capital of the Maurya Empire. Gour and Pundravardhana formed parts of the Mourya empire as is evinced from the inscriptions, Brahmi script on a seal discovered from the ruins of Mahasthangarh in the Bogra District of Bangladesh. Xuanzang  saw many Ashokan stupas at Pundravardhana.

The inscriptions discovered in the district of undivided Dinajpur and other parts of North Bengal, along with the Allahabad pillar inscriptions of Samudragupta, clearly indicate that the whole of North Bengal as far east as Kamrup formed a part of the Gupta Empire.

After the Guptas at the beginning of seventh century AD Sasanka, the king of Karnasubarna, as well as the king of Gauda, ruled independently for more than three decades. From the middle of the eighth century to the end of the 11th century the Pala dynasty ruled Bengal, and the kings were devoted to Buddhism. It was during their reign that the Jagadalla Vihara (monastery) in Barindri flourished paralleling with Nalanda, Vikramshila and Devikot.

Gour Era
The Pala empire yielded to the emergence of the Sen Dynasty. The Sen rulers were orthodox Hindus, and in the habit of moving from place to place within their kingdom. During this time, Buddhism went on the defensive. It eventually disappeared from the demographic map of Bengal. At the time of Gaudeshwara Lakshman Sen, Goud was known as Lakshmanabati. During his reign Bengal was attacked by the Turkic force of Bakhtiyar Khilji. King Lakshman Sen defeated Khilji in battle and successfully resisted Turkic invasion in his empire. After him Keshava Sen, Biswarup Sen, Madhava Sen etc. many Sena dynasty rulers ruled Gauda and hold the title Gaudeshwara  Then Deva dynasty kings of Chandradwip ruled Bengal. Deva dynasty king Danujmardandeva and Mahendra Deva both hold the title Gaudeshwara.

The name Mal Daha was coined (from Mal meaning riches and Daha meaning lake). Sultans Ilyas Shah, Firuz Shah, Sikandar Shah, Raja Ganesha, Alauddin Hussain Shah and Nasiruddin Nasrat Shah were the notable rulers of the medieval age. Afghan warrior Sher Shah Suri conquered Gour and was repelled by Mughal emperor Humayun. Humayun, loving the mango of Gour, named the place Jannatabad (garden of heaven). Firuz Shah Tughlaq, Ghiyasuddin and the Mughal army invaded Gour to suppress rebellion several times.

Relics of Islamic architecture structures are present in Malda district, such as Firuz minar, Adina Mosque (the largest mosque of South Asia at the time), and Qutwali Gate. During the Mughal rule, the capital was removed to Dhaka due to a course change of the river Ganges. Muslim rule ended in 1757. Koch army invasion increased during the downfall of Gour.

Post-Gour Era

After the war of Palassy, the British rule started in 1757. The English traders settled in the southern bank of the river Mahananda. Some indigo plant chambers, trade centre, and offices were established. William Carey worked here. But the glory days were gone.

This district was formed out of some portions of outlying areas of Purnia, Dinajpur and Rajshahi districts in 1813. At the time of Dr. B. Hamilton (1808–09), the present thanas of Gazole, Malda, Bamongola, and part of Habibpur were included in the district of Dinajpur and the thanas of Harischandrapur, Kharba, Ratua, Manikchak, and Kaliachak were included in the district of Purnia. In 1813, in consequence of the prevalence of serious crimes in the Kaliachak and Sahebganj thanas and also on the rivers, a Joint Magistrate and Deputy Collector were appointed at English Bazar, with jurisdiction over a number of police stations centering that place and taken from the two districts. Thus the district of Malda was born. The year 1832 saw the establishment of a separate treasury and the year 1859 the posting of a full-fledged magistrate and collector.

Up to 1876, this district formed part of Rajshahi Division and between 1876 and 1905, it formed part of Bhagalpur Division. In 1905, it was again transferred to Rajshahi Division and until 1947, Malda remained in this division. During the first Partition of Bengal of 1905, this district was attached to the newly created province of Eastern Bengal and Assam. Malda has a history of the Indigo movement led by Rafique Mondal. The Santhals got insurgent and captured historic Adina Mosque in support of Jeetu.  Again in August 1947, this district was affected by partition.  Between 12–15 August 1947, the fate of the district as to which side it should go, to Pakistan or to India, was undecided because the announcement of the partition award of Sir Radcliffe did not make this point clear. During these few days, the district was under a Magistrate of East Pakistan. When the details of the Radcliffe Award were published, the district came over to West Bengal on 17 August 1947. However, the sub-division of Nawabganj was severed from Malda and was given to East Pakistan as a sub-division of the Rajshahi district.

Geography
The total population (as of 2001 Census) was recorded as 3,290,160.

Malda is called the gateway of North Bengal. It was once the capital of Gour-Banga with its  lay of the land classified into Tal, Diara, and Barind.

To the south is Murshidabad district, to the north are  North Dinajpur district and South Dinajpur district. To the east is the international border with Bangladesh. To the west is Santhal Parganas of Jharkhand and Purnea of Bihar.

Malda City

Malda, the district headquarters which lends its name to the district, during its early days grew up only near the side of the river Mahananda, and now the place is known as Phulbari. Some of the oldest houses can be found here. The city started to grow from 1925 to 1930. Now nearly a half-million people live in this city, and it is one of the biggest cities of West Bengal. It was a part of the historic city of Gour. Malda is recognized as the  Old Malda municipality and the English Bazar municipality. Its notable railway station is named as Malda Town.

Mahadipur international border crossing
The Mahadipur international border crossing is on the Malda-Rajshahi route at Mahadipur town in Malda district.

Local newspapers
The first monthly periodicals published from Malda was Kusum, edited by Radhesh Chandra Seth, a noted personality of the then Malda. Though the exact date of its first publications is not known, it has been assumed by the informed sources that Kusum was first published in the 1890s. In 1896, Radhesh Chandra published two weekly newspapers Gourdoot and Gourbarta. In 1897 Maldaha Samachar edited by Kaliprasanna Chakrabarty began to be published. Maulavi Abdul Ganikhan published 'Malda Akhbar' in 1914. In the same year, another periodical Gambhira' edited by Krishna Charan Sarkar was published. Damru, Adina and Minar—three weekly newspapers were published in 1941. The editors were Nanda Gopal Chowdhury, Akbar Munshi and Abdur Rahaman respectively.

The most important among them was Gourdoot which was first published on 1896 by Radhesh Chandra Seth. But within a short period, the publication of the newspaper came to an end as the editor faced a serious financial loss. The 'Gourdoot' again began to be published from 1912 under the editorship of Lalbihari Majumdar. Majumdar was a great scholar and his literary sense was appreciated by Benoy Kumar Sarkar and Radhesh Chandra Seth. In this endeavor, the editor was greatly supported by them and financed by Sarat Chandra Roy Chowdhury, Maharaja of Chancal. The Gourdoot was used to be published on Thursday of each week. The paper contained 6 pages and the price is one anna in 1944. The political outlook of the newspaper is pro-congress. Moreover, Lalbihari Majumdar, its editor took a pioneering role in organizing the congress movement in Malda. He has for a long time been the vice-president of the district Congress. The periodical had an implied antipathy towards Gandhian ideology.

In modern times there are also some local newspapers published in Malda, the most prominent among them are Maldaha Samachar, Rupantorer Pothe, Gour Malda Sambad Aamader Malda, etc. 'Rupantorere Pothe' is published in every Sunday in each week. Maldaha Samachar and Gour Maldaha Sambad are published every Wednesday and Friday respectively.

Popular movements in Malda
The most important among the popular movement is the one led by Jitu Santhal in 1932. Historians like Tanika Sarkar observes Jitu's movement was rooted in the rich tradition of tribal struggle in Malda. The early form of Santhal resistance was migration, which Professor Ashim Sarkar thinks amounted to a kind of passive resistance. Active struggle between the Santhals and their landlords began about 1910.

As the barind (barindra) area began to be transformed into a developed agricultural zone, the zamindars of barind began to enhance the rent and curb the rights so far enjoyed by the Santhal from 1910 onwards. M.O Carter mentions cases were commonly found in which the lands cultivated by the adhiars, which were previously their occupancy holdings but had been sold up in rent or mortgage sales. This caused friction among zamindars and Santhals. The friction took an alarming proportion as early as 1910 when a zamindar of Bulbulchandi tried to enhance the rent. The Santhal tenants rose into protest. The gravity of the situation compelled Mr. Vas, the District Magistrate, to interfere and fix the rent. It was in this backdrop of oppression, exploitation and injustice. Jitu Santhal of Kochakandahar village of Habibpur began to mobilise the Santhals for a widespread movement. In 1926 Jitu became the leader of the Santhals by converting them to Manuvadi Hinduism. In the same year 'Jitu's Sanyasi Dal' defied police order to perform a Kali puja to assert its new Hindu status. In September 1928 Santhals under Jitu's leadership looted the autumn crop of Sikharpur which had recently been taken away from them in barind region. The District Magistrate and the Superintendent of the Police rushed to the spot with armed police. After much skirmishes, Jitu along with his sixty followers arrested at the hand of the police.

Economy
In 2006 the Ministry of Panchayati Raj named Malda one of the country's 283 most backward districts (out of a total of 640). It is one of the eleven districts in West Bengal currently receiving funds from the Backward Regions Grant Fund Programme (BRGF).
No notable industry is made here. Most of the people of the district are agricultural labourer and unskilled labourer.

Divisions

Administrative subdivisions
The district comprises two subdivisions: Chanchal and Malda Sadar. Chanchal consists of six community development blocks: Chanchal–I, Chanchal–II, Ratua–I, Ratua–II, Harishchandrapur–I and Harishchandrapur–II. Malda Sadar subdivision consists of Old Malda  municipality, English Bazar municipality and nine community development blocks: English Bazar, Gazole, Habibpur, Kaliachak–I, Kaliachak–II, Kaliachak–III, Manickchak, Old Malda and Bamangola. English Bazar is the district headquarters. There are 12 police stations, 15 development blocks, 2 municipalities, 146 gram panchayats and 3,701 villages in this district.

Other than municipality areas, each subdivision contains community development blocs, which in turn, are divided into rural areas and census towns. In total there are 10 urban units, 2 municipalities and 3 census towns. English Bazar and Old Malda form an urban agglomeration.

Chanchal subdivision
 Chanchal I (community development block) consists of rural areas (8 gram panchayats) and town Chanchal,(second largest town in Malda).
 Chanchal II (community development block) consists of rural areas only (7 gram panchayats).
 Ratua I (community development block) consists of rural areas only (10 gram panchayats).
 Ratua II (community development block) consists of rural areas only (8 gram panchayats).
 Harishchandrapur I (community development block) consists of rural areas only (7 gram panchayats).
 Harishchandrapur II (community development block) consists of rural areas only (9 gram panchayats).

Malda Sadar subdivision
 English Bazar: municipality
 Old Malda: municipality
 English Bazar (community development block) consists of rural areas only (11 gram panchayats).
 Gazole (community development block) consists of rural areas only (15 gram panchayats).
 Habibpur (community development block) consists of rural areas (11 gram panchayats) and three census towns: Kachu Pukur, Kendua and Aiho.
 Kaliachak I (community development block) consists of rural areas only (14 gram panchayats).
 Kaliachak II (community development block) consists of rural areas only (9 gram panchayats).
 Kaliachak III (community development block) consists of rural areas only (14 gram panchayats).
 Manikchak (community development block) consists of rural areas only (11 gram panchayats).
 Old Malda (community development block) consists of rural areas only (6 gram panchayats).
 Bamangola (community development block) consists of rural areas only (6 gram panchayats).

Assembly Constituencies

Villages 
 

Chitholia

Demographics

Bengalis about 91% including Bengali Muslims and Bengali Hindus form the majority of the district population. Bengali Muslims about 51.27% form the majority of Malda District population whereas Bengali Hindus are the second largest community forming about 48% of District population. According to the 2011 census Malda district has a population of 3,988,845, roughly equal to the nation of Liberia or the US state of Oregon. This gives it a ranking of 58th in India (out of a total of 640). Its population growth rate over the decade 2001-2011 was 21.5%. Malda has a sex ratio of 939 females for every 1000 males, and a literacy rate of 62.71%. Scheduled Castes and Scheduled Tribes make up 20.94% and 7.87% of the population respectively.

Community
Malda has a largely diverse range of population groups. People from adjoining regions like Bihar and Murshidabad district came here since centuries. People of various classes and tribes like Polia, Shershabadia, Khotta, Panjhra, Chain Mondal, Rajbanshi, and Santhal inhabit the district.

Religion 

Muslims are the majority in the district, and are most dominant in the northwest and south along the Padma River. Hindus are majority in Gazole (74.51%), Barmangola (89.96%), Habibpur (94.96%), Old Maldah (70.00%), and Manikchak (55.96%) CD blocks as well as urban areas, and are a significant minority in Harischandrapur I (40.31%), English Bazar (48.34%) and Kaliachak III (49.01%) CD blocks.

Language 

The language spoken by the populace of Malda district is predominantly Bengali. A Bengali dialect, called Varendri Bengali is spoken by majority of the population of the district. Khotta, Santali, Maithili and Hindi languages are also spoken by some minority population throughout the district.

Culture
Malda has special cultural sorts like Gombhira, Alkap, Kavigan etc.

Festivals
Almost all of the major religious festivals are celebrated, like
 Durga puja
 Kali Puja
 Diwali
 Dussehra
 Eid al-Fitr
 Eid al-Adha
 Muharram
 Milad un-Nabi
 Shab-e-Barat
Shab-e-Kadar
 Guru Nanak Jayanti
 Christmas
 Ratha-Yatra
 Maha Shivratri

Fairs

Some of the most reputed cultural fairs of the district are
 Ramkeli Fair, Gour
 Aiho and Bulbulchandi ' Kali Puja Fair
 Debipur Haribasar 32 Prahar Mela.
 Gobarjanna Kalipujo MelM
 Charak Fair
 Chobbish (24) Prahor at Shingabad and Rishipur
 Dariapur Urush at Dariapur, Kaliachak
 Gazole Utsab
 Kahala Urush at Mothabari
 Kahala Durga Puja Fair .
 Kartik puja Fair
 Moyna Bishohari Mela.
 Eid Fair, Pirana Pir Dargah
 Muharram Fair, at Sattari
 Maha Shivratri Fair or Bhole Bam at Amrity
  Christmas Carnival, Englishbazar, Malda
32 praxhar harinam sankirtan at Debipur (Ratua 1,Malda)

Tourist attractions 

 Adina Relics
 Adina Mosque
 Gol ghar
 Eklakhi mosque
 Adina deer park

 Relics of Gour
 Firoz minar
 Chika Masjid
 Qutwali Gate
 12-gated mosque
 Qudm-e-Rasul, dargah shrine believed to contain the footprint of the Prophet

Gobarjanna Kali Mandir 
 Aquatic Bengal
 Jami Masjid
 Nimai Sarai Tower
 Pandua Sharif
 Pirana Pir Dargah.
 Lost monastery of Jagjivanpur
 Temple of Ramakrishna Mission
 Temple of Jahura Kali (Local avatar of Goddess Chandi)
 Chanchal Rajbari
 Sattari Jame Mosque
 Debipur Haribasar Radhagobinda Temple (Debipur,Ratua 1,Malda)
 Amrity Shiv Mandir

Education
Notable educational institutions of the district include:

Schools

 A. C. Institution
 Barlow Girls' High School
 Lalit Mohan Shyam Mohini High School
 Malda Railway High School
 Malda Town High School
 Malda Zilla School
 Ramakrishna Mission Vivekananda Vidyamandir 
 Usha Martin School, Malda

Engineering Colleges

 Ghani Khan Choudhury Institute of Engineering & Technology
 IMPS College of Engineering and Technology, established - 2003

General degree Colleges

 Chanchal College
 Gazole Mahavidyalaya
 Gour Mahavidyalaya
 Harishchandrapur College
 Kaliachak College
 Malda College
 Malda Women's College
 Manikchak College
 Pakuahat Degree College
 Samsi College
 South Malda College

Medical schools

 Malda Medical College and Hospital

Polytechnic Colleges

 Malda Polytechnic
 Ratua Satyendra Nath Bose Government Polytechnic

University

 University of Gour Banga

Notable people

 Momtazuddin Ahmed
 Subhamita Banerjee
 Abdur Rahim Boxi
 Sandip Chakrabarti
 Shibram Chakraborty
 A. B. A. Ghani Khan Choudhury
 Abu Hasem Khan Choudhury
 Krishnendu Narayan Choudhury
 Raja Ganesha
 Jiva Goswami
 Tafazzal Hossain, politician
 Sabitri Mitra
 Mausam Noor
 Rubi Noor
 Uma Roy
 Krishna Jiban Sanyal
 Benoy Kumar Sarkar, Indian social scientist, professor, nationalist
 Santi Gopal Sen
 Shamsuddin Ilyas Shah
 Jalaluddin Muhammad Shah
 Sikandar Shah
 Bidhushekhar Shastri
 Tapan Sikdar
 Sabina Yeasmin

See also

 History of Bengal
 Gour

Notes

References

External links

 Official Website

 
Districts of West Bengal
Minority Concentrated Districts in India
1813 establishments in British India